Vidéoformes is an international video art event. Created in 1986, it's taking place at Clermont-Ferrand (France).

Award winners 
 2002: Christin Bolewski, incident.net (Grégory Chatonsky, Julie Morel, Karen Dermineur, Marika Dermineur, Reynald Drouhin), Laurent Vicente & Thomas Bernardet, Pierre-Yves Cruaud, Pascal Liévre, Christian Barani
 2003 : Gabriela Golder, Christoph Oertli, Liisa Lounila, Sven Harguth, Pierre Villemin, Olivier Mégaton, Alicia Ortiz de Zavallos, Panoplie.org
 2004: Haim Ben Shitrit, Sophie Loret-Naumovitz, Samer Najari, Cao Guimaraes, Thomas Berthelon, Nicolas Clauss & Jean-Jacques Birgé, Anonymes, Stanza
 2005 : Vincent Dudouet, Jan Paters, Franck Dudouet, Adolph Kaplan, Jean-Gabriel Périot, Olivier Bosson, Stanza, Jimmy Owenns, Sylvain Hourany
 2006 : Chris Oakley, Corine Stubl, Collectif_fact (Claude Piguet, Annelore Schneider, Swann Thommen), Helene Abram, Chia-chi Yu, Isabel Sadurni, Laurent Mareschal, Galina Myznikova
 2007: Laurent Pernot, Kika Nikolela, Jimmy Owenns, Frank Minet
 2008 : Nicolas Clauss, Mihai Grecu, Christoph Oertli, Jan Peters, Bernard Mulliez
 2009 : Clorinde Durand, Maix Mayer, Neil Beloufa, Mihai Grecu
 2010 : Wei Liu, HeeWon Navi Lee, Jim Vieille, Owen Eric Wood, François Vogel, Robert Croma, Vicent Gisbert
 2011 : Nina Suominen, Shelly Silver, Reynold Reynolds, Jean-Claude Taki, Marie-Catherine Theiler & Jan Peters

References

External links 
  Vidéoformes-

Art festivals in France
Clermont-Ferrand
Annual events in France
1986 establishments in France